Indian Sands near Brookings, Oregon is an archaeological site that was listed on the National Register of Historic Places in 1992.

Archaeological finds 
In 2002, a team of researchers from Oregon State University found evidence of human presence on the southern Oregon coast at the Indian Sands area of Boardman State Park dating more than 10,000 years ago — more than 2,000 years older than previously known archaeological sites on Oregon's coast. Carbon dating of artifacts (similar to ones found on the Alaskan and British 
Columbia coasts) suggested an origin approximately 12,000 years ago.

See also
Carpenterville, Oregon—a community near Brookings, Oregon

References

Archaeological sites on the National Register of Historic Places in Oregon
Geography of Curry County, Oregon
Brookings, Oregon
National Register of Historic Places in Curry County, Oregon
Curry County, Oregon